Mrs. Palfrey at the Claremont is a 2005 US-produced comedy-drama film based on the 1971 novel by Elizabeth Taylor. It was directed by Dan Ireland and produced by Lee Caplin, Carl Colpaert and Zachary Matz from a screenplay by Ruth Sacks Caplin.

The film stars Joan Plowright and Rupert Friend, with Zoë Tapper, Anna Massey, Robert Lang, Marcia Warren, Georgina Hale, Millicent Martin, Michael Culkin and Anna Carteret. It is the final film role of Robert Lang, who died on November 6, 2004, a year before the film's release. The film is dedicated in his memory.

Plot 
All but abandoned by her family in a London retirement hotel, Mrs Palfrey (Joan Plowright) strikes up a curious friendship with a young writer, Ludovic Meyer (Rupert Friend). Fate brings them together after she has an accident outside his basement flat. The two newly found friends discover they have a lot more in common with each other than they do with other people their own age. Ludovic inadvertently leads Mrs. Palfrey through her past; Mrs. Palfrey inadvertently leads Ludovic to his future.

Book 
The 2005 film is based on the 1971 novel entitled Mrs. Palfrey at the Claremont by Elizabeth Taylor.

Television play
The novel was dramatised in 1973 as part of the BBC series Play for Today, with Celia Johnson playing Mrs Palfrey.

Cast
 Joan Plowright as Sarah Palfrey
 Rupert Friend as Ludovic Meyer
 Zoë Tapper as Gwendolyn
 Robert Lang as Mr Osborne
 Marcia Warren as Mrs Post
 Anna Massey as Mrs Arbuthnot
 Georgina Hale as Mrs Burton
 Millicent Martin as Mrs de Salis

References

External links
 
 Dovegreyreader scribbles: Mrs Palfrey At The Claremont ~ Elizabeth Taylor Retrieved 2012-10-27

2005 films
2005 comedy-drama films
British comedy-drama films
Films based on British novels
Films directed by Dan Ireland
Films set in hotels
Films set in London
2005 comedy films
2005 drama films
2000s English-language films
2000s British films